Soft grunge is a fashion trend that originated on Tumblr around the late 2000s and early 2010s, influenced by grunge fashion and other 1990s fashion styles.

History 
The fashion style originated on the social media platform Tumblr. Alternative Press writer Marian Phillips cited Sky Ferreira as having "largely popularized" the style beginning in 2009.

i-D magazine cited the style as influential on both the e-girl and VSCO girl fashion styles, which originated in the late-2010s.

Fashion 
Soft grunge is influenced by 1990s fashion, particularly grunge fashion. It often makes use of pastel colours, particularly pinks and blues.

Soft grunge outfits often include: the usage of studs and spikes, Vans skate shoes, platform shoes, floral patterns, flannel shirts, ripped jeans, flower crowns and tennis skirts. Hair is also often dyed.

Music 

Soft grunge music merges elements of pop punk, emo, alternative rock and sometimes shoegazing. Notable soft grunge bands include Citizen, Title Fight, Turnover, Basement, Balance and Composure and Tigers Jaw.

References 

Fashion aesthetics
Internet memes
Grunge